Homoeomma elegans is a species of spiders in the family Theraphosidae. It is found in Argentina.

References 

 Homoeomma elegans at the World Spider Catalog

Theraphosidae
Spiders described in 1958
Spiders of Argentina